John Kinley Dewar  (born 9 September 1959) is an Australian academic. He is the current vice-chancellor of La Trobe University.

Education
He was educated at Abingdon School and Hertford College, Oxford.

Career

Dewar is an internationally known family law specialist. He was a member of the Commonwealth Attorney-General's Family Law Pathways Advisory Group from 2000 to 2001 and a former member and chair of the Family Law Council from 1998 to 2004.

Before working at Griffith University, Dewar taught at the universities of Lancaster and Warwick in the United Kingdom and was a fellow and tutor in law at Hertford College, Oxford. He was Head of Education and Training for Allen & Overy (London) from 1988 to 1990.

Griffith University

Dewar moved from the United Kingdom in 1995 to take up a professorial position in the Griffith Law School, where he eventually became the dean of the school from 1999 to 2002. From 2002 to 2005, he was the pro vice-chancellor for business and law and then became deputy vice-chancellor (academic).

University of Melbourne

Dewar moved to the University of Melbourne in April 2009, becoming the deputy vice-chancellor (global relations). In September that year, he was appointed provost of the university, a role similar to his previous one at Griffith University. The role's focus was "on refining the Melbourne Model and ensuring successful second phase implementation of the University’s graduate programs in 2011".

La Trobe University 
Dewar became the sixth vice-chancellor of La Trobe University in Melbourne, Australia, in January 2012. On arrival, he declared that his goal was to ensure that La Trobe be "recognised as the natural alternative to Victoria's two Group of Eight universities, with a unique appeal other universities can't offer".

In 2012, Dewar announced a plan to cut 500 subjects and 41 jobs. Dewar ran from student protestors frustrated with his plan to cut university subjects and job and escaped via a network of tunnels under the university. In 2014, Dewar announced that 350 staff would be sacked without any voluntary redundancies.

In 2020 as a consequence of the effects of COVID-19 on university revenue, Dewar was one of four vice-chancellors who negotiated with the National Tertiary Education Union's leadership to deliver the Australian Universities Job Protection Framework. La Trobe staff subsequently voted to vary the university's collective agreement pursuant to the Job Protection Framework, opting to take pay cuts to protect the financial equivalent of around 225 jobs.

Humanities and the arts became the subject of reductions in November 2020, with Dewar informing staff that some subjects were no longer financially viable.

In 2021, Dewar consulted on a proposal to close the school of molecular science and reassign its disciplines to other schools in a bid to reduce costs.

Universities Australia 
In April 2021, Dewar was elected chair of Universities Australia. In July 2022, he delivered a speech at the National Press Club arguing the case for investing in universities.

Other appointments 
Dewar holds a number of other directorships including the Olivia Newton-John Cancer Research Institute, the Committee for Melbourne and the Foundation for Australian Studies in China. He is also a member of the University Foreign Interference Taskforce, the University of Lincoln's 21st Century Lab Higher Education Reference Group and the Champions of Change Coalition.

He is an honorary fellow of Hertford College, Oxford, an adjunct professor in the Melbourne Law School and the La Trobe Law School, and a visiting professor at the Helena Kennedy Centre for International Justice at Sheffield Hallam University.

Awards 
In 2020, Dewar was made an Officer of the Order of Australia (AO) in the Australia Day Honours List "in recognition of his distinguished service to education through leadership roles in the universities sector, and to professional organisations".

See also
 List of Old Abingdonians

References

1959 births
Living people
Australian legal scholars
Allen & Overy people
People educated at Abingdon School
Alumni of Hertford College, Oxford
Academic staff of La Trobe University
Academic staff of the University of Melbourne
Fellows of Hertford College, Oxford
Academic staff of Griffith University
British expatriate academics
British emigrants to Australia
Officers of the Order of Australia